Robert McElliott (July 10, 1915 – February 1, 1975) was an American professional basketball player in the United States' National Basketball League. He played for the Hammond Ciesar All-Americans in five games during the 1938–39 season. He attended St. Viator College.

References

1915 births
1975 deaths
American men's basketball players
Basketball players from Illinois
Centers (basketball)
Forwards (basketball)
Hammond Ciesar All-Americans players
St. Viator Irish basketball players